Hudson Hall most commonly refers to:

 Hudson Hall (arts organization), an arts venue in Hudson, New York
 Hudson Hall (University of Missouri), a dormitory at the University of Missouri

See also